ISO/IEC TR 12182 is an Information technology standard published in 1998 by the Joint Task Committee 1 (JTC1) of the International Organization for Standardization (ISO) and the International Electrotechnical Commission (IEC). It defines a software categorization in the field of software engineering.

References 
 International Organization for Standardization
 International Electrotechnical Commission
 JTC1
 Veridion ISO 27001 Directory
 ISO 12182 Standard

12182